The "Dr Juraj Njavro" National Memorial Hospital, commonly known as the Vukovar Hospital, is a public hospital in Vukovar in eastern Croatia. It is the primary hospital in the town of Vukovar and surrounding municipalities which together with hospitals in Vinkovci and Osijek covers the region of eastern Slavonia.

The hospital gained national prominence in 1991 during and at the end of the Battle of Vukovar when 93 of its patients became victims of the Vukovar massacre. International Criminal Tribunal for the former Yugoslavia convicted  on a war crimes indictment Veselin Šljivančanin and Mile Mrkšić in Vukovar Hospital case while Miroslav Radić was released after being acquitted.

See also
 List of hospitals in Croatia

References

Hospitals in Croatia
Buildings and structures in Vukovar